Portrait of Adeline Ravoux is an oil painting from June 1890 by Vincent van Gogh.

It is in the collection of the Cleveland Museum of Art.

Description 
The twelve-year-old Adeline Ravoux was the daughter of Arthur-Gustave Ravoux, whose inn is where Van Gogh lodged in Auvers-sur-Oise. She later wrote a memoir of Van Gogh's stay with them. She witnessed Van Gogh's return to the inn after the fatal incident where he shot himself: "Vincent walked bent, holding his stomach, again exaggerating his habit of holding one shoulder higher than the other. Mother asked him: " M. Vincent, we were anxious, we are happy to see you to return; have you had a problem?" He replied in a suffering voice: "No, but I have…" he did not finish, crossed the hall, took the staircase and climbed to his bedroom. I was witness to this scene. Vincent made on us such a strange impression that Father got up and went to the staircase to see if he could hear anything."

Other versions

References 

Paintings by Vincent van Gogh
Paintings in the collection of the Cleveland Museum of Art
1890 paintings